Maha Shivaratri is a Hindu festival celebrated annually in honour of the deity Shiva, between February and March. According to the Hindu calendar, the festival is observed on the fourteenth day of the dark (waning) half of the lunar month of Phalguna or Magha. The festival also commemorates the wedding of Shiva and Parvati, and the occasion that the Shiva performs his divine dance, called the Tandava.

It is a notable festival in Hinduism, marking a remembrance of "overcoming darkness and ignorance" in life and the world. It is observed by remembering Shiva and chanting prayers, fasting, and meditating on ethics and virtues such as honesty, non-injury to others, charity, forgiveness, and the discovery of Shiva. Ardent devotees stay awake throughout this night. Others visit one of the Shiva temples or go on a pilgrimage to the Jyotirlingams. The festival is believed to have originated in 5th century BCE.

In Kashmir Shaivism, the festival is called Har-ratri or phonetically simpler Haerath or Herath by Shiva devotees of the Kashmir region.

Description

Maha Shivaratri is particularly important in the Shaivism tradition of Hinduism. Unlike most Hindu festivals which are celebrated during the day, Maha Shivaratri is celebrated at night. Furthermore, unlike most Hindu festivals which include expression of cultural revelry, the Maha Shivaratri is a solemn event notable for its introspective focus, fasting, meditation on Shiva, self study, social harmony and an all-night vigil at Shiva temples.

The celebration includes maintaining a jagaran, an all-night vigil and prayers, because Shaiva Hindus mark this night as "overcoming darkness and ignorance" in one's life and the world through Shiva. Offerings of fruits, leaves, sweets and milk are made to Shiva, some perform all-day fasting with Vedic or tantric worship of Shiva, and some perform meditative yoga. In Shiva temples, the sacred Panchakshari mantra of Shiva, "Om Namah Shivaya" is chanted throughout the day. Devotees praise Shiva through the recitation of the hymn called the Shiv Chalisa.

Legend and significance

The Maha Shivaratri is mentioned in several Puranas, particularly the Skanda Purana, Linga Purana, and Padma Purana. These medieval era Shaiva texts present different versions associated with this festival, such as fasting, and offering reverence to a lingam - an emblematic figure of Shiva.

Different legends describe the significance of Maha Shivaratri. According to one legend in the Shaivism tradition, this is the night when Shiva performs the heavenly dance of creation, preservation and destruction. The chanting of hymns, the reading of Shiva scriptures and the chorus of devotees joins this cosmic dance and remembers Shiva's presence everywhere. According to another legend, this is the night when Shiva and Parvati got married. A different legend states the offering to Shiva icons such as the linga is an annual occasion to get over past sins if any, to restart on a virtuous path and thereby reach Mount Kailasha and liberation. It is also believed that on this particular day Shiva gulped the halahala produced during the Samudra Manthana and beheld it in his neck which was bruised and turned blue, after which he acquired the epithet Nilakantha. It is also believed that the famous Neelkanth Mahadev Temple is the place where this incident took place.

The significance of dance tradition to this festival has historical roots. The Maha Shivaratri has served as a historic confluence of artists for annual dance festivals at major Hindu temples such as at Konark, Khajuraho, Pattadakal, Modhera and Chidambaram. This event is called Natyanjali, literally "worship through dance", at the Chidambaram temple which is famous for its sculpture depicting all dance mudras in the ancient Hindu text of performance arts called Natya Shastra. Similarly, at Khajuraho Shiva temples, a major fair and dance festival on Maha Shivaratri, involving Shaiva pilgrims camped over miles around the temple complex, was documented by Alexander Cunningham in 1864.

Worship

India 

Maha Shivaratri is celebrated in Tamil Nadu with great pomp and fanfare in the Annamalaiyar temple located in Tiruvannamalai district. The special process of worship on this day is  'Girivalam'/Giri Pradakshina, a 14-kilometer bare foot walk around Shiva's temple on top of the hill. A huge lamp of oil and camphor is lit on the hilltop at sunset - not to be confused with Karthigai Deepam.. A ritual marathon is undertaken by the devotees to the 12 Shiva shrines in the district of Kanyakumari on the day of Shivaratri called Sivalaya Ottam. In recent years, the Isha Foundation has been a major patron of such festivities in India, with even Prime Minister Narendra Modi having attended the celebration hosted at the site of the Giant Adiyogi in Coimbatore.

The major Jyotirlinga Shiva temples of India, such as in Varanasi and Somanatha, are particularly frequented on Maha Shivaratri. They serve also as sites for fairs and special events.

In Andhra Pradesh and Telangana, Special pujas are held at Pancharamas - Amararamam of Amaravati, Somaramam of Bhimavaram, Draksharamam, Kumararama of Samarlakota and Ksheerarama of Palakollu. The days immediately after Shivaratri are celebrated as Brahmotsavaalu at Srisailam, one of 12 Jyotirlinga sites. Mahashivaratri utsavalu are held at the Rudreshwara Swamy's 1000 pillar temple in Warangal. Devotees throng for the special poojas at Srikalahasti, Mahanandi, Yaganti, Antarvedi, Kattamanchi, Pattiseema, Bhairavakona, Hanamkonda, Keesaragutta, Vemulawada, Panagal, Kolanupaka amongst others. Shivaratri yatras are held at Mallayya gutta near Kambhalapalle, Gundlakamma Kona near Railway Koduru, Penchalakona, Bhairavakona, Uma Maheswaram amongst others.

The Mandi fair is in the town of Mandi is particularly famous as a venue for Maha Shivaratri celebrations. It transforms the town as devotees pour in. It is believed that all gods and goddesses of the area, said to number more than 200, assemble here on the day of Maha Shivaratri. Mandi, located on the banks of Beas, is popularly known as the "Cathedral of Temples" and one of the oldest towns of Himachal Pradesh, with about 81 temples of different deities on its periphery.

In Kashmir Shaivism, Maha Shivaratri is celebrated by the Hindus of Kashmir and is called, "Herath" in Kashmiri, a word derived from the Sanskrit word "Hararatri" the "Night of Hara" (another name of Shiva). Shivaratri, regarded as the most important festival of the community, for instance, is celebrated by them on trayodashi or the thirteenth of the dark half of the month of Phalguna (February–March) and not on the chaturdashi or the fourteenth as in the rest of the country. The reason for it is that this long drawn festival that is celebrated for one full fortnight as an elaborate ritual is associated with the appearance of Bhairava (Shiva) as a jvala-linga or a linga of flame. It has been described as Bhairavotsava in Tantric texts as on this occasion Bhairava and Bhairavi, his Shakti or cosmic energy, are propitiated through Tantric worship.

According to the legend associated with the origin of the worship, the linga appeared at pradoshakala or the dusk of early night as a blazing column of fire and dazzled Vatuka Bhairava and Rama (or Ramana) Bhairava, Mahadevi's mind-born sons, who approached it to discover its beginning or end but miserably failed. Exasperated and terrified they began to sing its praises and went to Mahadevi, who herself merged with the awe-inspiring jvala-linga. The Goddess blessed both Vatuka and Ramana that they would be worshipped by human beings and would receive their share of sacrificial offerings on that day and those who would worship them would have all their wishes fulfilled. As Vatuka Bhairava emerged from a pitcher full of water after Mahadevi cast a glance into it, fully armed with all his weapons (and so did Rama), he is represented by a pitcher full of water in which walnuts are kept for soaking and worshipped along with Shiva, Parvati, Kumara, Ganesha, their ganas or attendant deities, yoginis and kshetrapalas (guardians of the quarters) – all represented by clay images. The soaked walnuts are later distributed as naivedya. The ceremony is called 'vatuk barun' in Kashmiri, which means filling the pitcher of water representing the Vatuka Bhairava with walnuts and worshipping it.

Central India has a large number of Shaiva followers. The Mahakaleshwar Temple, Ujjain is one of the most venerated shrines consecrated to Shiva, where a large congregation of devotees gathers to offer prayers on the day of Maha Shivaratri. Tilwara Ghat in the city of Jabalpur and the Math Temple in the village of Jeonara, Seoni are two other places where the festival is celebrated with much religious fervour.

In Punjab, Shobha Yatras would be organised by various Hindu organisations in different cities. It is a grand festival for Punjabi Hindus.

In Gujarat, Maha Shivaratri mela is held at Bhavnath near Junagadh where bathing in the Mrugi (Mrigi) kund is considered holy. According to myth, Shiva himself comes to bath in the Mrugi kund.

In West Bengal, Maha Shivaratri is observed devoutly by unmarried girls and boys seeking a suitable husband or wife, often visiting Tarakeswar.

In Odisha, Maha Shivaratri is also known as Jagara. People fast for their wishes whole day and take food after 'Mahadipa' (The great diya) rises at the top of Shiva temple. It usually is held during midnight. Unmarried girls also worship for seeking a suitable husband.

Special anointing rtiuals and worships were performed at the Karuvadikkuppam Kurusithananda Temple in Pondicherry on the eve of Maha Shivaratri with various items including milk and sandalwood for the Shivalingam. Also, a Natyanjali was held at the temple premises.

Nepal 

Maha Shivaratri is a national holiday in Nepal and celebrated widely in temples all over the country, especially in the Pashupatinath temple. Thousands of devotees visit the famous Shiva Shakti Peetham nearby as well. Holy rituals are performed all over the nation. Maha Shivaratri is celebrated as Nepali Army Day amid a spectacular ceremony held at the Army Pavilion, Tundikhel. Artists from various classical music and dance forms perform through the night. On Maha Shivaratri, married women pray for the well-being of their husbands, while unmarried women pray for a husband like Shiva, considered as the ideal husband. Shiva is also worshipped as the Adi Guru (first teacher) from whom the divine wisdom originates. In the capital city of Kathmandu, there is a provision of road blockage where children use ropes and strings to stop the people or vehicle passing through in exchange of money. Worshippers of Shiva stay up all night and smoke marijuana as Shiva is believed to be an avid smoker and marijuana smoking on this day is called taking ‘Shivako Prasad’ or ‘Shiva Buti’ literally the "Blessing of Shiva". Crowds of sadhus and saints travel to Pashupatinath Temple located in Kathmandu from all of Nepal and neighbouring India to celebrate the day and perform puja on this day.

Pakistan 
Another major temple where Shivaratri is celebrated is the Shree Ratneshwar Mahadev Temple in Karachi whose Shivaratri festival is attended by 25,000 people. On the Shivaratri night, Hindus in Karachi fast and visit the temple. Later, devotees from the Chanesar Goth come to the temple carrying water from the holy river Ganges, in order to bathe the idol of Shiva. Puja is performed until 5 am, when an aarti is then done. Devotees then walk barefoot with women carrying a pooja thali containing flowers, incense sticks, rice, coconut and a diya to the sea after which they are free to break their fast. They eat breakfast later on, which was made in the temple kitchen.

Outside South Asia 
Maha Shivaratri is the main Hindu festival among the Shaiva Hindu diaspora from Nepal and India. In Indo-Caribbean communities, thousands of Hindus spend the beautiful night in over four hundred temples across multiple countries, offering special jhalls (an offering of milk and curd, flowers, sugarcane and sweets) to Shiva. In Mauritius, Hindus go on pilgrimage to Ganga Talao, a crater-lake.

See also
 Pradosha
 Rudraksha
 Vibhuti
 Rudra
 Linga
 Jangam

References

External links

 
 Maha Shivaratri celebrations in the USA by The Pluralism Project
 Mahashivratri images

Hindu festivals
Hindu holy days
February observances
March observances
Hindu festivals in India
Public holidays in Nepal
Public holidays in Sri Lanka
Religious festivals in Bangladesh
Religious festivals in India
Hindu festivals in Nepal
Shaivism
Vrata